Reodar  is a town in Sirohi District of Rajasthan state in India. It is situated at 52 km east of the Sirohi. It is headquarters of the tehsil as well as Panchayat Samiti by the same name. Mandar is the main village connecting Reodar to Gujarat.

It is also a Legislative Assembly Constituency of Rajasthan.

It is the main town between Rajasthan and Gujarat it lies on border.

See also
Magariwara

References

 Reodar Coordinates

Cities and towns in Sirohi district